The Wagener (also called Wagener Price and Wagoner) is a cultivar of the domesticated apple. It was first farmed in 1791 in New York, and is the parent of the Idared and, possibly, the Northern Spy. Despite the early popularity of the Wagener, it is no longer widely grown.

History
In 1791, George Wheeler started a seedling farm in the area of Penn Yan, New York, with apple seeds that he had brought from  Dutchess County, New York. Abraham Wagener, the namesake for the Wagener apple, purchased the nursery in 1795 and planted the trees on his land. The apple was recognized by the New York State Agricultural Society in 1847, and began to be propagated extensively in the United States. In 1910, it was brought to England where it received an Award of Merit from the Royal Horticultural Society.

Appearance and flavor
The Wagener is a medium-sized apple with a flattened, sometimes irregular, shape. The color is mostly red with yellow highlights near the crown. The flesh is white to cream-colored, very crisp, fine-grained, and tender, with a sweet-tart flavor.

Cultivation
The tree grows quickly and is an early fruit producer, contributing to its popularity among farmers wanting an early return from their orchards. The Wagener is criticized for its over-production which can result in crowding and production of low-quality fruit. Without proper pruning and thinning of the developing fruit, the health of the trees can suffer.

References 

American apples